The teardrop butterflyfish (Chaetodon unimaculatus) is a species of marine ray-finned fish, a butterflyfish belonging to the (family Chaetodontidae. It is found in the Indo-Pacific region.

Description
The teardrop butterflyfish has a whitish body with yellow dorsal, anal and pelvic fins, this yellow colour extends on to the back. The upper flank is marked  with a large teardrop shaped black blotch and there is a wide, black, vertical bar though the eye. There are delicate yellowish-orange chevrons on the flanks in front of the black teardrop and there is another black vertical band with runs from the rear of the dorsal fin, across the caudal peduncle to the rear of the anal fin. The dorsal fin contains 12-13 spines and 19-23 soft rays while the anal fin contains 3 spines and 18-20 soft rays.

Distribution
The teardrop butterflyfish is found in the eastern Indian and western Pacific Oceans from Christmas Island and Cocos (Keeling) Island east as far as Hawaii, the Marquesas and Ducie Island, north as far as Southern Japan, and south to Lord Howe in the Tasman Sea and the central coast of New South Wales.

Habitat and biology
Teradrop butterflyfish are normally encountered in small groups in reef flats, clear lagoon and seaward reefs where they feed on soft and hard corals, as well as polychaetes, small crustaceans and filamentous algae. This is an oviparous species and they are monogamous with the sexes forming pairs to breed.

Taxonomy
The teardrop butterflyfish was first formally described in 1787 by the german medical doctor and zoologist Marcus Elieser Bloch ((1723-1799) with the type locality give as the East Indies, i.e. Indonesia.<ref name = CofF>{{Cof record | spid = 20766 | title = Chaetodon unimaculatus | access-date = 2 December 2020}}</ref> In the western Indian Ocean it is replaced by the yellow teardrop butterflyfish (Chaetodon interruptus), now a separate species but previously considered a subspecies of Chaetodon unimaculatus.

In its subgenus Lepidochaetodon it is sometimes considered a separate genus. It is only distantly related to other Chaetodon species such as the sunburst butterflyfish (Chaetodon kleinii) and the Tahiti butterflyfish (Chaetodon trichrous'').

Utilisation
The teardrop butterflyfish is relatively common in the aquarium trade. It is caught by some artisanal fisheries.

References

External links
 
 Teardrop Butterflyfish @ Fishes of Australia

teardrop butterflyfish
Fish of Oceania
Marine fish of Northern Australia
Fish of Southeast Asia
Fish of Hawaii
Fish of Micronesia
Fish of Palau
Least concern biota of Asia
Least concern biota of Oceania
teardrop butterflyfish